George Viduka Odary (born November 28, 1986) is a retired Kenyan striker who featured for Kenyan Premier League sides KCB, Nairobi City Stars, Tusker F.C. and Kenya junior sides U17 and U20.

Club career
George turned out for KCB in 2003 and 2004, and returned for the 2008 season after spending two seasons at Tusker F.C. He then moved to Kawangware-based Nairobi City Stars in 2009 where he spent the 2010, 2011 and part of the 2012 seasons. He left halfway through the 2012 season to pursue a non-footballing assignment in Juba, South Sudan.

International
Odary featured for Kenya U17 in 2002 in games against Ghana. He made the provisional kenya national football team team lists in 2005 and 2006.

Honours

Club
Tusker
 Kenyan Premier League title: (2006/7)

References

External links
 

1986 births
Living people
Kenyan footballers
Nairobi City Stars players
Tusker F.C. players
Kenyan Premier League players